The table below shows all results of Škoda Motorsport in European Rally Championship.

ERC results

ERC Victories
{|class="wikitable" style="font-size: 95%; "
! No.
! Event
! Season
! Driver
! Co-driver
! Car
|-
| style="text-align:right; padding-right:0.5em;"| 1
|  46. Belgium Geko Ypres Rally 2010
| style="text-align:center;" rowspan="2"| 2010
|  Jan Kopecký
|  Petr Starý
| rowspan="22"| Škoda Fabia S2000
|-
| style="text-align:right; padding-right:0.5em;"| 2
|  51. Rali Vinho da Madeira 2010
|  Jan Kopecký
|  Petr Starý
|-
| style="text-align:right; padding-right:0.5em;"| 3
|  52. Rallye International du Valais 2011
| style="text-align:center;"| 2011
|  Antonín Tlusťák
|  Jan Škaloud
|-
| style="text-align:right; padding-right:0.5em;"| 4
|  29. Internationale Jänner Rallye 2012
| style="text-align:center;" rowspan="7"| 2012
|  Jan Kopecký
|  Petr Starý
|-
| style="text-align:right; padding-right:0.5em;"| 5
|  39. Croatia Rally 2012
|  Juho Hänninen
|  Mikko Markkula
|-
| style="text-align:right; padding-right:0.5em;"| 6
|  43. Rally Bulgaria 2012
|  Dimitar Iliev
|  Yanaki Yanakiev
|-
| style="text-align:right; padding-right:0.5em;"| 7
|  48. Belgium Geko Ypres Rally 2012
|  Juho Hänninen
|  Mikko Markkula
|-
| style="text-align:right; padding-right:0.5em;"| 8
|  41. Bosphorus Rally 2012
|  Juho Hänninen
|  Mikko Markkula
|-
| style="text-align:right; padding-right:0.5em;"| 9
|  42. Barum Czech Rally Zlín 2012
|  Juho Hänninen
|  Mikko Markkula
|-
| style="text-align:right; padding-right:0.5em;"| 10
|  69. Rajd Polski 2012
|  Esapekka Lappi
|  Janne Ferm
|-
| style="text-align:right; padding-right:0.5em;"| 11
|  30. Internationale Jänner Rallye 2013
| style="text-align:center;" rowspan="8"| 2013
|  Jan Kopecký
|  Pavel Dresler
|-
| style="text-align:right; padding-right:0.5em;"| 12
|  37. Rally Islas Canarias El Corte Inglés 2013
|  Jan Kopecký
|  Pavel Dresler
|-
| style="text-align:right; padding-right:0.5em;"| 13
|  48. SATA Rallye Açores 2013
|  Jan Kopecký
|  Pavel Dresler
|-
| style="text-align:right; padding-right:0.5em;"| 14
|  49. Belgium Geko Ypres Rally 2013
|  Freddy Loix
|  Frédéric Miclotte
|-
| style="text-align:right; padding-right:0.5em;"| 15
|  2013 Sibiu Rally
|  Jan Kopecký
|  Pavel Dresler
|-
| style="text-align:right; padding-right:0.5em;"| 16
|  2013 Barum Czech Rally Zlín
|  Jan Kopecký
|  Pavel Dresler
|-
| style="text-align:right; padding-right:0.5em;"| 17
|  40. Croatia Rally
|  Jan Kopecký
|  Pavel Dresler
|-
| style="text-align:right; padding-right:0.5em;"| 18
|  2013 Rallye International du Valais
|  Esapekka Lappi
|  Janne Ferm
|-
| style="text-align:right; padding-right:0.5em;"| 19
|  Rally Liepāja 2014
| style="text-align:center;" rowspan="4"| 2014
|  Esapekka Lappi
|  Janne Ferm
|-
| style="text-align:right; padding-right:0.5em;"| 20
| / 72. Circuit of Ireland 2014
|  Esapekka Lappi
|  Janne Ferm
|-
| style="text-align:right; padding-right:0.5em;"| 21
|  50. Geko Ypres Rally 2014
|  Freddy Loix
|  Johan Gitsels
|-
| style="text-align:right; padding-right:0.5em;"| 22
|  55. Rallye International du Valais 2014
|  Esapekka Lappi
|  Janne Ferm
|-
| style="text-align:right; padding-right:0.5em;"| 23
|  51. Kenotek Ypres Rally 2015
| style="text-align:center;" rowspan="2"| 2015
|  Freddy Loix
|  Johan Gitsels
| rowspan="15"| Škoda Fabia R5
|-
| style="text-align:right; padding-right:0.5em;"| 24
|  45. Barum Czech Rally Zlín 2015
|  Jan Kopecký
|  Pavel Dresler
|-
| style="text-align:right; padding-right:0.5em;"| 25
|  62. Seajets Acropolis Rally 2016
| style="text-align:center;" rowspan="5"| 2016
|  Ralfs Sirmacis
|  Arturs Šimins
|-
| style="text-align:right; padding-right:0.5em;"| 26
|  52. Kenotek by CID LINES Ypres Rally 2016
|  Freddy Loix
|  Johan Gitsels
|-
| style="text-align:right; padding-right:0.5em;"| 27
|  7. auto24 Rally Estonia 2016
|  Ralfs Sirmacis
|  Māris Kulšs
|-
| style="text-align:right; padding-right:0.5em;"| 28
|  46. Barum Czech Rally Zlín 2016
|  Jan Kopecký
|  Pavel Dresler
|-
| style="text-align:right; padding-right:0.5em;"| 29
|  Rally Liepāja 2016
|  Ralfs Sirmacis
|  Arturs Šimins
|-
| style="text-align:right; padding-right:0.5em;"| 30
|  52. Azores Airlines Rallye 2017
| style="text-align:center;" rowspan="3"| 2017
|  Bruno Magalhães
|  Hugo Magalhães
|-
| style="text-align:right; padding-right:0.5em;"| 31
|  47. Barum Czech Rally Zlín 2017
|  Jan Kopecký
|  Pavel Dresler
|-
| style="text-align:right; padding-right:0.5em;"| 32
|  Rally Liepāja 2017
|  Nikolay Gryazin
|  Yaroslav Fedorov
|-
| style="text-align:right; padding-right:0.5em;"| 33
|  64. EKO Acropolis Rally 2018
| style="text-align:center;" rowspan="5"| 2018
|  Bruno Magalhães
|  Hugo Magalhães
|-
| style="text-align:right; padding-right:0.5em;"| 34
|  47. Cyprus Rally 2018
|  Simos Galatariotis
|  Antonis Ioannou
|-
| style="text-align:right; padding-right:0.5em;"| 35
|  48. Barum Czech Rally Zlín 2018
|  Jan Kopecký
|  Pavel Dresler
|-
| style="text-align:right; padding-right:0.5em;"| 36
|  75. PZM Rajd Polski - Rally Poland 2018
|  Nikolay Gryazin
|  Yaroslav Fedorov
|-
| style="text-align:right; padding-right:0.5em;"| 37
|  Rally Liepāja 2018
|  Nikolay Gryazin
|  Yaroslav Fedorov
|-
|}

Czech auto racing teams
Motorsport results
European Rally Championship teams